The Marshall Islands did not compete at the 2011 World Championships in Athletics from August 27 to September 4 in Daegu, South Korea.

Team selection

One athlete was
announced to represent the country
in the event due to the preliminary Entry List.  However, he did not appear on the Official Start List.

References

External links
Official local organising committee website
Official IAAF competition website

Nations at the 2011 World Championships in Athletics
World Championships in Athletics
Marshall Islands at the World Championships in Athletics